Darko Butorović (born 12 August 1970 in Split) is a Croatian former footballer who played for Hajduk Split and other foreign clubs.

International career
He made his debut for Croatia in a June 1995 European Championship qualification match away against Ukraine, coming on as a first half substitute for Zvonimir Boban, and earned a total of 3 caps, scoring no goals. His final international was a June 1997 Kirin Cup match against Turkey.

References

External links
 
 
 Archive of Hajduk Split matches at Hajduk Split official website.
 
 

1970 births
Living people
Footballers from Split, Croatia
Association football fullbacks
Yugoslav footballers
Croatian footballers
Croatia international footballers
RNK Split players
HNK Hajduk Split players
FC Porto players
SBV Vitesse players
S.C. Farense players
Croatian Football League players
Primeira Liga players
Eredivisie players
Croatian expatriate footballers
Expatriate footballers in Portugal
Croatian expatriate sportspeople in Portugal
Expatriate footballers in the Netherlands
Croatian expatriate sportspeople in the Netherlands